Karabash is a town in Chelyabinsk Oblast, Russia, located  northwest of Chelyabinsk. Population:  15,942 (2002 Census);

History
It was founded in 1822 as a settlement of gold-miners. Town status was granted to it on June 20, 1933.

Administrative and municipal status
Within the framework of administrative divisions, it is, together with nine rural localities, incorporated as the Town of Karabash—an administrative unit with the status equal to that of the districts. As a municipal division, the Town of Karabash is incorporated as Karabashsky Urban Okrug.

Economy and ecology

A copper smelting plant is situated in the town, and its toxic waste has created extremely large amounts of pollution and serious health problems for the inhabitants.

References

Notes

Sources

External links

Official website of Karabash 
Karabash Business Directory  

Cities and towns in Chelyabinsk Oblast
Monotowns in Russia